Mesoporous silicates are silicates with a special morphology.

Background
Porous inorganic solids have found great utility as catalysts and sorption media because of their large internal surface area, i.e. the presence of voids of controllable dimensions at the atomic, molecular, and nanometer scales.  With increasing environmental concerns worldwide, nanoporous materials have become more important and useful for the separation of polluting species and the recovery of useful ones. In recent years there has been great progress in applying environmentally friendly zeolites in heterogeneous reaction catalysis. The reason for their success is related to their specific features in converting molecules having kinetic diameter below 1 nm, but they become inadequate when reactants with sizes above the dimensions of the pores have to be processed. Research efforts to synthesize zeolites with larger pore diameter, high structural stability and catalytic activity have not given the expected results yet.

Characteristics
The discovery of a new family of mesoporous molecular sieves in the early 1990s by Kuroda et al., known as KSW-1 and FSM-16, and by ExxonMobil, called M41S, opened new possibilities to prepare catalysts for reactions of relatively large molecules. The silicate wall of the pores is amorphous. Mesoporous silicates, such as MCM-41 and SBA-15 (the most common mesoporous silicates), are porous silicates with huge surface areas (normally ≥1000 m²/g), large pore sizes (2 nm ≤ size ≤ 20 nm) and ordered arrays of cylindrical mesopores with very regular pore morphology. The large surface areas of these solids increase the probability that a reactant molecule in solution will come into contact with the catalyst surface and react. The large pore size and ordered pore morphology allow one to be sure that the reactant molecules are small enough to diffuse into the pores.

References

See also
High-performance liquid chromatography
Gas-liquid chromatography
Silica gel
Nanotechnology

Silicates
Catalysts
Silicate